Abtar may refer to:
 Abtar, Khuzestan (ابطر - Ābṭar)
 Abtar, Sistan and Baluchestan (ابتر - Abtar)
 Abtar Rural District, in Sistan and Baluchestan Province